Gubernatorial elections were held on 18 September 2016 in nine federal subjects of Russia. All elections passed in one round.

In seven federal subjects, there were direct elections of governors, and in two, the governor was be elected by the regional parliaments.

None of the incumbent governors had lost the elections.

Race summary

Results

Direct elections
The total number of votes in seven federal subjects.

Vote in Parliament
The total number of votes in two federal subjects.

Notes

References

2016 elections in Russia
2016
September 2016 events in Russia